The Sophie Germain Prize (in French: Prix Sophie Germain) is an annual mathematics prize from the French Academy of Sciences conferred since the year 2003. It is named after the French mathematician Sophie Germain, and comes with a prize of €8000.

"The Sophie Germain Prize of the Institut de France has been awarded every year by the French Academy of Sciences since 2003 to researchers who have carried out fundamental research in mathematics. Through this prize, the Academy of Sciences furthers its mission of encouraging the advancement of science."

Recipients 

 2003 Claire Voisin
 2004 Henri Berestycki
 2005 Jean-François Le Gall
 2006 Michael Harris
 2007 Ngô Bảo Châu
 2008 Håkan Eliasson
 2009 Nessim Sibony
 2010 Guy Henniart
 2011 Yves Le Jan
 2012 Lucien Birgé
 2013 Albert Fathi
 2014 Bernhard Keller
 2015 Carlos Simpson
 2016 François Ledrappier
 2017 Xiaonan Ma
 2018 Isabelle Gallagher
 2019 Bertrand Toën
 2020 Georges Skandalis
 2021 Étienne Fouvry
 2022 Thierry Bodineau

See also

 List of mathematics awards

References 

Awards of the French Academy of Sciences
Mathematics awards